The Armed Forces Division (AFD) is the principal national command authority for national defense of the People's Republic of Bangladesh. The command and control of the Bangladesh Armed Forces is exercised in this division, under direct control and supervision by the prime minister, who is also in charge of Ministry of Defence. Lieutenant General Waqar Uz Zaman is the present Armed Forces Division's Principal Staff Officer. The headquarter is located in Dhaka Cantonment.

History 

In 1976, then President Ziaur Rahman organised and created the Commander-in-Chief's Secretariat under the office of the President, consolidating central authority dealing with all national security issues while operating under various degrees of authority and responsibility under Ministry of Defense. President Abdus Sattar intended to further organize and structure the body into Bangladesh National Security Council under the office of the President. However, President Hossain Mohammad Ershad put an immediate hold to bringing the NSC under full civilian control after seizing state power. It was named the Supreme Command Headquarters after 8 years, on 10 November 1986 sealing armed forces control over national security.

After 1991, the presidential system of government by Act of Parliament was abolished, and by October 1994, the  Armed Forces Division was integrated into the Prime Minister's Office and concurrently the combined armed forces authority was transferred to this government body. The Armed Forces Division provide directive to the military of Bangladesh during disaster relief operations. Its officers are members of the National Disaster Management Council. The division coordinates relief operations with the Directorate of Relief and Rehabilitation, Disaster Management Bureau and the Ministry of Disaster Management and Relief. In 2017, the ministry coordinated with the division to handle the influx of Rohingya refugees in Bangladesh.

Organization 
Armed Forces Division is composed of Principal Staff Officer's Office, five Directorates and an Administrative Company.
The Directorates are:
 Operations and Plans Directorate (O & P).
 Training Directorate (Trg).
 Civil and Military Relation Directorate (CMR).
 Administration and Logistics Directorate (A&L).
 Intelligence Directorate (Int).

References 

Defence agencies of Bangladesh
Government agencies of Bangladesh
Military of Bangladesh
Bangladesh
Government divisions of Bangladesh